Selo nad Laškim is a settlement in the Municipality of Laško in eastern Slovenia. It lies in the hills southeast of Laško. The area is part of the traditional region of Styria. It is now included with the rest of the municipality in the Savinja Statistical Region.

Name
The name of the settlement was changed from Selo to Selo nad Laškim in 1953.

References

External links
Selo nad Laškim on Geopedia

Populated places in the Municipality of Laško